Tillandsia dexteri (T. dexteri) is a perennial grass plant species in the genus Tillandsia and in the taxonomic family bromeliads (Bromeliaceae). This species is native to Costa Rica in the neotropical realm. T. dexteri was discovered in 1989 by H.Luther.

References

dexteri
Flora of Costa Rica